Kennedy Lake may refer to:

 Kennedy Lake (Arizona)
 Kennedy Lake (Glacier County, Montana)
 Kennedy Lake (Vancouver Island)